Pinocchio is a 1976 made-for-TV musical starring Sandy Duncan in the title role and Danny Kaye as Geppetto. It was first broadcast March 27, 1976 on CBS and rerun on April 18, 1977.

Plot summary
Framed by the story of a young theater girl's desire to study and work apart from her father, the classic 1883 children's story of Pinocchio is presented as a subplay with the young girl (Sandy Duncan) as Pinocchio and her father (Danny Kaye) as Geppetto.

Cast

 Sandy Duncan ... Pinocchio
 Danny Kaye ... Geppetto
 Clive Revill ... Coachman
 Don Correia ... Candlewick's Mate
 Ben Lokey ... Dancer
 Gary Morgan ... Candlewick
 Roy Smith ... Candlewick's Mate
 Liz Torres ... Cat
 Flip Wilson ... Fox

Musical numbers
 "Talking to Myself" - Geppetto
 "What's That?" - Pinocchio, Geppetto and ensemble
 "I Like It" - Pinocchio and ensemble
 "The Money Tree" - Fox and Cat
 "M-O-R-E" - Fox, Cat and Pinocchio
 "Look at Me Now" - Geppetto and ensemble
 "If I Could Start All Over, Would I?" - Pinocchio
 "Fun, Fun, Fun" - Pinocchio and ensemble
 "I Want to Go Home" - Pinocchio and Geppetto

Reception
Pinocchio won two Emmy Awards for Outstanding Individual Achievement in Children's Programming, one for Costume Design (Bill Hargate) and another for Videotape Editing. It was also nominated for Emmys for Outstanding Children's Special and Outstanding Makeup (designed by Stan Winston).

Production notes
In 1976, this was the first of two TV musical adaptations of a children's classic starring Danny Kaye and costarring a female as a young boy. On December 12, 1976, NBC telecast Peter Pan with Kaye as Captain Hook and Mia Farrow in the title role.

Ron Field was choreographer.

Home media
Pinocchio was released on DVD on October 24, 2000.

References

External links

1970s fantasy adventure films
1976 films
1976 in American television
1976 television specials
CBS television specials
CBS original programming
1970s children's fantasy films
Musicals based on novels
American musical television films
Musical television specials
Pinocchio films
Television shows based on fairy tales
Television shows based on The Adventures of Pinocchio
1970s English-language films
American fantasy adventure films
American television films
1970s American films